The EastLink hotel is a sculpture designed by Callum Morton. It was unveiled on 27 November 2007 and cost $1.2 million (AUD) to construct. It is situated along EastLink, a toll road located in Victoria, Australia.

In popular culture
In April 2019, American folk punk band the Violent Femmes announced their album Hotel Last Resort which features a photograph of the hotel on its cover.

References

External links

Public art in Victoria (Australia)
2007 sculptures
Outdoor sculptures in Australia